Ferdinand Karl Piëch (17 April 1937 – 25 August 2019) was an Austrian business magnate, engineer and executive who was the chairman of the executive board (Vorstandsvorsitzender) of Volkswagen Group in 1993–2002 and the chairman of the supervisory board (Aufsichtsratsvorsitzender) of Volkswagen Group in 2002–2015.

A grandson of Ferdinand Porsche, Piëch started his career at Porsche, before leaving for Audi after an agreement that no member of the Porsche or Piëch families should be involved in the day-to-day operations of the Porsche company. Piëch eventually became the head of Audi, where he is credited with evolving and growing Audi into a competitor to equal Mercedes-Benz and BMW, thanks in part to innovative designs such as the Quattro and 100. In 1993, Piëch became the chairman and CEO of Volkswagen Group, which he is credited with turning into the large conglomerate it is today; He oversaw the purchase of Lamborghini and Bentley, as well as 
the founding of Bugatti Automobiles, all of which he integrated with the Volkswagen, Škoda, SEAT and Audi brands into a ladder-type structure similar to that used by Alfred Sloan at General Motors. Piëch was required to retire at age 65 per Volkswagen company policy, but he remained on its supervisory board and was involved in the company's strategic decisions until his resignation on 25 April 2015.

Educated as an engineer, Piëch influenced the development of numerous significant cars including the Porsche 911, Audi Quattro and notably, the Bugatti Veyron, which as of 2012 was the fastest, most powerful and most expensive road legal automobile ever built.  Due to his influence on the automobile industry, Piëch was named the Car Executive of the Century in 1999 and was inducted into the Automotive Hall of Fame in 2014.

Biography
Piëch was born in Vienna, Austria, to Louise (née Porsche; Ferdinand's daughter) and Anton Piëch, a lawyer. He studied at the Lyceum Alpinum Zuoz and graduated from the ETH Zurich, Switzerland, in 1962, with a degree in mechanical engineering, having written a master thesis about the development of a Formula One (F1) engine.  At the same time, Porsche was involved in F1 and developed an 8-cylinder engine for the Porsche 804.

From 1963 to 1971, he worked at Porsche in Stuttgart, on the development of the Porsche 906 and following models that led to the successful Porsche 917. In 1972, he moved to Audi in Ingolstadt. Starting from 1975, he was manager of technological engineering, being responsible for the concepts of many Audi models from the 1970s and 1980s, including the Audi 80, Audi 100 and the Audi V8. In 1977 he also initiated the development of a car for the World Rally Championship, resulting in the four-wheel drive Audi Quattro. The engine used in the Quattro model was a turbocharged inline-5 cylinder unit.

Piëch held a small engineering company in the time between leaving Porsche AG and joining Audi, and while there, he developed a 5-cylinder in-line diesel engine for Mercedes-Benz.  He picked up the concept again after moving to Audi, because there was a market demand for engines with more than 4 cylinders. At the time, Audi (and the Audi-derived VW Passat/Santana model range) used longitudinally mounted inline engines and front wheel drive. More conservative layouts with 6 cylinders were rejected because of engineering and production costs (V6 engine) or packaging requirements (straight 6 did not fit because front wheel drive required that it be mounted in front of the axle).

In 1993, Piëch moved to Volkswagen AG, parent company of the Volkswagen Group, where he became Chairman of the Board of Management, succeeding Carl Hahn. At that time Volkswagen was only three months from bankruptcy, and he was central to orchestrating its dramatic turnaround. He retired from the Board of Management in 2002, but still served in an advisory capacity as Chairman of the Supervisory Board.
In 2000, he was named chairman of Scania AB. He retired from the management board in 2002 and was succeeded as chairman by Bernd Pischetsrieder.

While head of Volkswagen Group, Piëch was known for his aggressive moves into other markets. He drove the Volkswagen and Audi brands upmarket with great success.  Piëch also pursued other marques, successfully acquiring Lamborghini for Audi, and establishing Bugatti Automobiles SAS. His purchase of British Rolls-Royce and Bentley was more controversial.  After successfully buying the Crewe, England, car building operation, including the vehicle designs, nameplates, administrative headquarters, production facilities, Spirit of Ecstasy and Rolls-Royce grille shape trademarks, VW was denied the use of the Rolls-Royce brand name, which had been licensed to BMW by Rolls-Royce Holdings, and was thought to be the most valuable part of the division. After tensions had formed between the two companies, VW later sold the Spirit of Ecstasy and Rolls-Royce grille shape trademarks to BMW, which allowed them to found Rolls-Royce Motor Cars, and produce a new line of cars that were unrelated to their predecessors, with all of the traditional Rolls-Royce styling cues. Although Piëch later claimed that he only really wanted the Bentley brand, as it was the higher volume brand, out-selling the equivalent Rolls-Royce by around two to one, the loss of the intellectual property rights for Rolls-Royce to rival BMW was widely seen as a major failure.

What was not a failure, however, was his effort to revitalize Volkswagen in North America.  Hahn's previous efforts to regain market share in North America – which he had built up as the head of Volkswagen of America from 1958 to 1965 – were unsuccessful, but Piëch helped reverse VW's fortunes by the decision to manufacture the Volkswagen New Beetle, the introduction of which in 1998 gave Volkswagen of America a much needed impulse, after years of selling competent, but bland offerings in the US.

Due to his continued influence in the auto industry, Automobile Magazine announced that Piëch has won their Man of the Year award for 2011.

Engineering

At Porsche, Piëch triggered significant changes in the company's policy. For example, the position of drivers in race cars was moved from the left to the right, as this gives advantages on the predominantly clockwise race tracks. After making mainly small  race cars that were supposed to be closely related to road cars, Porsche made a risky investment by unexpectedly building twenty-five  Porsche 917, surprising the rule makers at the FIA. Even Ferrari had needed to sell his company to Fiat before making such a move. Always thinking big, Piëch started development of a 16-cylinder engine for the Can-Am series.  It is probably no coincidence that his grandfather had developed a famous supercharged 16-cylinder engine for the Auto Union racing cars in the 1930s.  Piëch was denied the chance to complete it, as a turbocharged version of the existing 12-cylinder was simpler, more powerful and very successful.  Three decades later as CEO of Volkswagen Group, Piëch insisted on the very ambitious Bugatti Veyron, with a turbocharged W16-cylinder,  and  top speed. Some of these figures are still not higher than those of the Porsche 917/30, but higher than most current racing cars.  Piëch was also behind the Volkswagen Phaeton luxury saloon, which was intended as a rival to other German luxury cars, but the sales of the model have been disappointing.

Porsche ownership
Piëch owned a significant share of Porsche, exactly 10%. In order to prevent discussions among the many family members, a policy was established in early 1972 that no Porsche family member is allowed to be involved in the management of the company.  Even company founder Ferry Porsche, Piëch's uncle, only held a seat on the supervisory board of Porsche after the company's legal form was changed from a limited partnership to a private legal company.  This made Piëch move to Audi after the foundation of his engineering bureau.

Personal life
Piëch reportedly had 12 children from four different women, though an obituary published by The Detroit News mentioned him having 13 children. He was married to his second wife Ursula Piëch from 1984 to his death, he lived with her in retirement in Salzburg, Austria. One of his sons, Toni Piëch, is the founder of car company Piëch Automotive. He was dyslexic, and had a vast car collection that included two Bugatti Veyrons regularly driven by him and his wife.

Piëch collapsed suddenly on 25 August 2019 while having dinner with his wife in Aschau near Rosenheim, Oberbayern. He was rushed to hospital, where he was pronounced dead shortly thereafter. A specific cause of death wasn't released.

Personality and management style
An engineer by trade, Ferdinand Piëch was both known for his intricate involvement in product development from a technical standpoint, as well as his domineering personality. Piëch has been behind the development of multiple significant and influential automobiles, including the Porsche 911, Third generation (C3) Audi 100, Audi Quattro and Bugatti Veyron. Automotive blog Jalopnik said of Piëch, "He is the mad genius behind much of Porsche and Audi’s racing successes as well as VW’s all-out engineering and luxury push from the early 2000s. That’s what gave us cars like the Bugatti Veyron and the 12-cylinder VW Phaeton." Piëch is both noted for turning the Audi brand from an also-ran economy car builder to one of the most respected luxury brands in the world, as well as rescuing Volkswagen as a whole from near-bankruptcy and overseeing its transformation into the massive conglomerate it is today. Fellow automotive executive Bob Lutz described Piëch as "one of the most successful leaders in the automotive business" and "the greatest living product guy" in the automobile industry. Automotive News described Piëch as "a world-class eccentric but a figure of transcendent importance in the history of cars and car companies" who has had "The strangest and possibly most significant automotive industry career this side of Henry Ford". In their obituary, The Guardian said of Piëch, “His stewardship of VW has been indisputably successful. Piech will go down in history as an automotive legend, in the same class as Gottlieb Daimler, Henry Ford and Kiichiro Toyoda.”

Piëch has been described as being socially awkward and having an abrasive personality; some automotive journalists who have encountered Piëch described him as being uncomfortable to be around. Automotive News once noted, "Many of his CEO peers said they could not hold a normal conversation with him. Discussions could be punctuated with long stretches of unexplained silence." Piëch himself has acknowledged that he occasionally struggles to relate to other people and understand their feelings. As Piëch rose to the top of Volkswagen in the late 1980s and early 1990s, then-CEO Carl Hahn took notice of Piëch's poor social skills and tried to position him as a technocrat kept behind closed doors. Hahn was particularly bothered by how Piëch behaved during a visit to the Yasukuni Shrine; while a Shinto priest was showing the shrine's collection of vintage swords, Piëch examined one and told the priest that it was a fake. Subsequently, Hahn presented the Audi Avus quattro concept car himself at the 1991 Tokyo Motor Show and didn't allow Piëch to take part, which infuriated Piëch due to his extensive personal involvement in the Avus quattro's creation.

Piëch was widely interested in pushing technological boundaries in automotive development, especially as the head of Audi. Automotive News noted of this, "The company’s slogan “Vorsprung durch Technik” was the personification of Piech — the belief that technology was the answer to all problems in the auto business. Audi was the test bed to prove his theory and the springboard for his ambition." Piëch often spearheaded the development of audacious vehicles or oversaw business decision and strategies that baffled analysts, but still proved beneficial for the company as a whole. In recounting some of the extraordinary vehicles Volkswagen put in production under Piëch's watch, Wired noted that he alone pushed the Bugatti Veyron supercar into production, despite objection from other executives as well as the fact that Volkswagen lost what is believed to be millions on every Veyron sold: "Consider that for a moment. Long past the average retirement age, this gent greenlit one of the largest automotive losses in history and managed to keep his job. Moreover, he was hailed as a hero."

An aggressive and demanding manager, Piëch was known for setting both lofty and extremely specific goals and standards for projects. Another requirement was that the car should possess torsional rigidity of 37,000 N·m/degree. Piëch would often become personally involved in vehicle development, such as how he oversaw the development of the Audi 100's aerodynamics himself, keeping it secret from even Audi's top engineers to prevent any crucial details of the car's aerodynamic capabilities from leaking to competitors. Piëch often liked to ride along with automotive journalists during press test drives and would consider their critiques to improve Volkswagen's vehicles. Car and Driver writer John Phillips recounted how when he test drove the Volkswagen New Beetle during its launch in 1997, Piëch rode along and asked for his opinion on how its chassis and driving dynamics could be improved. Similarly, Piëch once demanded that an Automobile reviewer take the Volkswagen Phaeton up to its top speed while he rode along in the back seat.

With a leadership style described as "old fashioned", Piëch was known for his prolific firing of subordinates throughout his career, particularly how he engineered the ousting of former Volkswagen CEO Bernd Pischetsrieder and Porsche CEO Wendelin Wiedeking. According to Piëch, he fired any subordinate who "makes the same mistake twice". The Guardian noted, "Piech was known for his ability to outmanoeuvre competitors by stoking internal rivalries to his own advantage, even if it resulted in turning against his own managers, including the VW chief executive Bernd Pischetsrieder, to side with VW’s labour leaders." Piëch leveraged this reputation to use threats and intimidation to get subordinates to meet his lofty goals; during Piëch's induction into the Automotive Hall of Fame in 2014, fellow automotive executive Bob Lutz recounted a conversation he had with Piëch at the Frankfurt Auto Show in the early 1990s, in which he remarked how he was impressed with the fit and finish and tight body tolerances on Volkswagen's new models. Piëch told Lutz that he achieved this by assembling Volkswagen's top body engineers in his office and telling them they would all be fired if all of Volkswagen's vehicles didn't have body tolerances of 3 millimeters within six weeks. Wired described Piëch as "Machiavellian" and "an autocrat's autocrat". Bob Lutz said of his management style, "It's what I call a reign of terror and a culture where performance was driven by fear and intimidation[...]That management style gets short-term results, but it's a culture that's extremely dangerous. Look at dictators. Dictators invariably wind up destroying the very countries they thought their omniscience and omnipotence would make great. It's fast and it's efficient, but at huge risk." He would also describe Piëch as a "mad genius" that while he respected, he would never want to work for or with at any capacity. Lutz, CNBC, the American documentary TV series Dirty Money, among others, have claimed that the Volkswagen diesel emissions scandal is the result of the ruthless and tyrannical corporate culture Piëch installed at the company.
Although Piëch had tried a hostile takeover against Suzuki in 2010 and threatened its management, Suzuki won the case to terminate its partnership with Volkswagen at the International Court of Arbitration of the International Chamber of Commerce after Piëch fell from power, and could dissolve the capital tie-up until September 2015.

Awards
Named Car Executive of the Century (1999)
Wilhelm Exner Medal (2002).
Inducted into the Automotive Hall of Fame (2014)

Footnotes

Notes

References

External links

 Volkswagen boss denies slush fund knowledge

1937 births
2019 deaths
ETH Zurich alumni
Businesspeople from Vienna
Porsche family
Austrian automotive engineers
Volkswagen Group executives
Lamborghini people
Chief executives in the automobile industry
Audi people
Scania AB people
Škoda people
Austrian people of German Bohemian descent
Automotive businesspeople
Porsche people
Alumni of Lyceum Alpinum Zuoz
People with dyslexia